Children's Health Defense is an American 501(c)(3) nonprofit activist group mainly known for anti-vaccine propaganda and has been identified as one of the main sources of misinformation on vaccines. Founded under the name World Mercury Project in 2011, it is chaired by Robert F. Kennedy Jr. The group has been campaigning against various public health programs, such as vaccination and fluoridation of drinking water. The group has been contributing to vaccine hesitancy in the United States, encouraging citizens and legislators to support anti-vaccine regulations and legislation. Arguments against vaccination are contradicted by overwhelming scientific consensus about the safety and effectiveness of vaccines.

Background
Children's Health Defense alleges that a large proportion of American children have conditions as diverse as autism, attention deficit hyperactivity disorder, food allergies, cancer, and autoimmune diseases due to exposure to a variety of chemicals and radiation. The chemicals and radiation that Children's Health Defense has blamed and campaigned against include vaccines, pesticides, fluoridation of drinking water, paracetamol (acetaminophen), aluminum, wireless communications, and others. It has brought lawsuits targeting pesticides in food and agriculture.

Named the World Mercury Project until 2018, the Children's Health Defense is an influential anti-vaccine organization due to the prominence of its chairman, Robert F. Kennedy Jr. From almost nothing, the group's annual revenues jumped to almost half a million dollars when Kennedy got involved in 2015, then 1 million in 2018. With the group becoming a major disinformation hub during the COVID-19 pandemic, its revenue reached $6.8 million in 2020, more than doubling its revenue from the previous year. The organization receives a portion of the sales of Ty Bollinger's anti-vaccination video series, which it promotes. Despite its messaging impeding the government's efforts to limit the spread of COVID-19, Children's Health Defense received $145,400 in federally backed small business loans through the Paycheck Protection Program from JPMorgan Chase in 2020. The 2019 tax return for Children's Health Defense indicates that Kennedy was paid $255,000 for his services as chairman and chief counsel for the organization.

Children's Health Defense initiated a number of court cases, with little success. Requests for contributions to its litigation funds are a major component of its fundraising activities.

On February 15, 2017, with other anti-vaccination activists and actor Robert De Niro at his side, Kennedy challenged anybody to prove the use of thimerosal is safe "in the amounts contained in vaccines currently being administered to American children and pregnant women", ignoring a 1999 Food and Drug Administration study doing just that. Although the use of thimerosal in vaccines was phased out by 2001 (with one exception), this mercury compound is still often referred to by anti-vaccination groups. Overwhelming evidence indicates that vaccines are safe and effective.

Kennedy met with Donald Trump in January 2017. While Kennedy claimed the President agreed to establish a commission to study the risks allegedly associated with vaccines, government officials denied any decision was taken and nothing subsequently came of it.

Alleging widespread corruption within health care research and collusion by multiple governments, the group endorsed a recent edition of the book Judy Mikovits wrote about her discredited theories, with Kennedy writing the foreword. Kennedy's book The Real Anthony Fauci, published in 2021, repeats several discredited myths about the COVID-19 pandemic, notably about the effectiveness of ivermectin. During the pandemic, the group accused the United States government of supporting research on a vaccine as part of a plan to increase revenues for the pharmaceutical industry.

The growth of the group during the pandemic gave rise to international chapters, notably in Canada, Europe and Australia.

Anti-vaccination campaigns
Children's Health Defense is using social media and internet advertising to propagate anti-vaccination messages, targeting young parents and minorities in the United States. During the COVID-19 pandemic, those communications attempted to downplay the risk posed by the virus, to argue the new vaccines are dangerous, and to undermine public health authorities. The Center for Countering Digital Hate identifies the group as one of the leaders of the anti-vaccination movement online.

The organization also organized rallies against public health measures aiming at mitigating the impact of the pandemic, such as the one in Washington on January 23, 2022. This particular demonstration featured other leaders of the American anti-vaccination movement such as Del Bigtree; both Kennedy and Bigtree compared vaccine mandates to oppression inNazi-occupied countries during World War II. The demonstration was also attended by a group from neo-fascist organization Proud Boys.

CHD targets Black Americans with messaging linking COVID-19 vaccination with the Tuskegee Syphilis Study and other instances when ethical violations have been committed against minorities as part of medical studies. Such interventions are likely to hurt the Black community by increasing vaccine hesitancy within that vulnerable population. Echoing other actors in the anti-vaccination movement and Nation of Islam, Children's Health Defense claims that the United States government seeks to harm ethnic minorities by prioritizing them for COVID vaccines. The conspiracy theory is elaborated upon in an hour-long video production released in March 2021 by Children's Health Defense and Kennedy, along with recycled anti-vaccination stories about autism, Bill Gates and the Centers for Disease Control. Like other such conspiracy theory videos, it inserts true historical events into its narrative to make its fantastic claims appear more believable.

In step with the QAnon movement, their Instagram promotes the "Great Reset" theory and identifies "Big Pharma" as part of "the real deep state".

A study found Children's Health Defense was one of major buyers of anti-vaccine Facebook advertising in December 2018 and February 2019, the other being Stop Mandatory Vaccination. Heavily targeting women and young couples, the advertising highlighted the alleged risks of vaccines and asked for donations. According to an analysis by NBC News, the group is one of three major sources of false claims on vaccination shared on the internet, the other two being the fake news site Natural News and the website Stop Mandatory Vaccination. Facebook subsequently refused to carry anti-vaccination advertising from the group.

Children's Health Defense said that the efficacy of its non-advertising Facebook campaigns has been greatly affected by the platform taking additional measures against misinformation in 2019. In a lawsuit filed with the United States District Court for the Northern District of California in August 2020, against Facebook and four fact-checking services, the group said the viewership of some of its posts on vaccination and 5G wireless was reduced by 95% after they were labelled as misinformation. Even though those messages were allowed to be posted by the group and shared by users, Children Health Defense argues that labelling them as misinformation amounts to censorship; they allege their messages are presented merely as opinions rather than information and as such, cannot be characterized as misinformation. The organization is seeking $5 million in damages.

In January, 2023, CHD filed a complaint alleging the efforts of major news outlets to limit the spread of COVID-19 misinformation amount to a violation to the Sherman Antitrust Act. The complaint targets The Washington Post, the BBC, Associated Press and Reuters. Along with CHD and Robert F. Kennedy, Jr., the plaintiffs include other major spreaders of misinformation, including Joseph Mercola, Ty and Charlene Bollinger, Erin Elizabeth, Ben Tapper, Ben Swann and Jim Hoft. They present themselves as "online news publishers" victimized by media policies aiming at providing accurate reporting of COVID-related information. The case will be heard by United States District Court for the Northern District of Texas judge Matthew Kacsmaryk.

Criticism
Despite Kennedy's claims that he is in fact not against vaccines, several critics point out he and his organization spread common anti-vaccine arguments as part of their core messages. According to David Gorski, the World Mercury project was "a group dedicated to fear mongering over mercury in vaccines as a cause of autism and health problems". Kennedy has stated the media and governments are engaged in a conspiracy to deny that vaccines cause autism.

Other misinformation promoted by Children's Health Defense is a conspiracy theory in relation to the Great Reset that claims that elites, including Bill Gates, plan to take over the United States and establish a Marxist high-control regime.

On May 8, 2019, while some areas in the United States were struggling with a resurgence of measles due to low vaccination rates, Kathleen Kennedy Townsend, Joseph P. Kennedy and Maeve Kennedy McKean publicly stated that while their relative Robert has championed many admirable causes, he "has helped to spread dangerous misinformation over social media and is complicit in sowing distrust of the science behind vaccines."

In August 2022, the organization's accounts on Meta platforms, Facebook and Instagram, were terminated for repeatedly breaching the platforms' policies. While Instagram had removed Robert F. Kennedy Jr.'s account from its platform in February 2021, it had yet to take any measure against the Children's Health Defense account. Between Instagram and Facebook, the organization had a reach of 300,000 subscribers in 2021.

New York City measles lawsuit
On April 19, 2019, the Kings County Supreme Court dismissed a lawsuit in which Robert Krakow, Robert F. Kennedy Jr. and Patricia Finn of Children's Health Defense represented five parents of unvaccinated children protesting the decision by New York City authorities to impose mandatory measles-mumps-rubella vaccinations for residents in parts of Williamsburg, as a response to the epidemic of measles in that area. The lawsuit was filed four days earlier against the New York City Department of Health and Human Hygiene and its commissioner.

In his ruling, Judge Lawrence Knipel indicated that the arguments presented by the plaintiffs amounted to little more than "unsupported, bald faced opinion". Responding to Children's Health Defense's claims that the city's reaction to a "garden-variety annual measles outbreak" was excessive, the judge pointed out that the documents filed as evidence in fact demonstrated otherwise. He concluded that "the unvarnished truth is that these diagnoses represent the most significant spike in incidences of measles in the United States in many years and that the Williamsburg section of Brooklyn is at its epicenter. It has already begun to spread to remote locations."

See also
Freedom Angels Foundation
Polio eradication
Science Moms

References

External links 

Children's Hospital of Philadelphia - Vaccine Education Center

Anti-vaccination organizations
Autism pseudoscience
Non-profit organizations based in Georgia (U.S. state)
Organizations established in 2016
Anti-vaccination in the United States
Conspiracy theorists